The 2022 Pit Boss 250 was the sixth stock car race of the 2022 NASCAR Xfinity Series and the second iteration of the event. The race was held on Saturday, March 26, 2022, in Austin, Texas, at the Circuit of the Americas, a  permanent road course. The race was run over 46 laps. A. J. Allmendinger of Kaulig Racing would win the race after leading the most laps. This was Allmendinger's eleventh career Xfinity Series win, and his first of the season. To fill out the podium, Austin Hill of Richard Childress Racing and Cole Custer of SS-Green Light Racing would finish second and third, respectively.

Background 
Circuit of the Americas (COTA) is a grade 1 FIA-specification motorsports facility located within the extraterritorial jurisdiction of Austin, Texas. It features a 3.426-mile (5.514 km) road racing circuit. The facility is home to the Formula One United States Grand Prix, and the Motorcycle Grand Prix of the Americas, a round of the FIM Road Racing World Championship. It previously hosted the Supercars Championship, the FIA World Endurance Championship, the IMSA SportsCar Championship, and IndyCar Series.

On September 30, 2020, it was announced that COTA would host a NASCAR Cup Series event for the first time on May 23, 2021. The lower Xfinity and Camping World Truck Series were also added as support events. On December 11, 2020, it was announced that NASCAR would run the full 3.41 mile course.

Entry list 

 (R) denotes rookie driver.
 (i) denotes driver who is ineligible for series driver points.

* Denotes entry has withdrawn from the event

Practice 
The only 30-minute practice session was held on Friday, March 25, at 4:00 PM CST.

Qualifying 
Qualifying was held on Friday, March 25, at 4:30 PM CST. Since Circuit of the Americas is a road course, the qualifying system is a two group system, with two rounds. Drivers will be separated into two groups, Group A and Group B. Each driver will have a lap to set a time. The fastest 5 drivers from each group will advance to the final round. Drivers will also have one lap to set a time. The fastest driver to set a time in the round will win the pole. 

Full qualifying results

Race results 
Stage 1 Laps: 14

Stage 2 Laps: 16

Stage 3 Laps: 16

Standings after the race 

Drivers' Championship standings

Note: Only the first 12 positions are included for the driver standings.

References 

2022 NASCAR Xfinity Series
NASCAR races at Circuit of the Americas
Pit Boss 250
Pit Boss 250